Joe Wong may refer to:
 Joe Wong (American football) (born 1976), American football player
 Joe Wong (comedian) (born 1970), Chinese American stand-up comedian
 Joe Wong (musician) (born 1980), American drummer and composer

Joseph Wong may refer to:
 Joseph Wong (born 1948), Hong Kong civil servant
 Joseph Wong (political scientist), Canadian academic
 Joseph Yu Kai Wong, Canadian physician and philanthropist

Joey Wong may refer to:
 Joey Wong (born 1967), Hong Kong-based Taiwanese actress and singer
 Joey Wong (baseball) (born 1988), American baseball player
 Jo Y. Wong, Canadian professor of mechanical engineering